
This is a list of aircraft in alphabetical order beginning with 'Cd' through to 'Cn'.

Cd–Cn

CD 

(Rogers Construction Co, Gloucester, NJ)
 CD Air Express

CEA

(Centre-Est Aéronautique)
 CEA DR.1050
 CEA DR.1051 Sicile Record
 CEA DR.1052 Excellence
 CEA DR.220
 CEA DR.221 Dauphin
 CEA DR.250 Capitaine
 CEA DR.253 Regent
 CEA DR.315 Petit Prince
 CEA DR.340 Major
 CEA DR.360 Chevalier
 CEA DR.380 Prince

CEI

(Auburn, CA)
CEI Free Spirit Mk II

Celier Aviation 

(Piotrków Trybunalski, Poland / Safi, Malta)
 Celier Kiss
 Celier Xenon 2
 Celier Xenon 3
 Celier Xenon 4
 Celier Xenon IV
 Celier Xenon XL
 Celier XeWing

Centrair

 Centrair C101 Pegase
 Centrair C201 Marianne
 Centrair SCN 34 Alliance

Central 

(Central Aircraft Company, Mahaska, KS)
 Central 1927 monoplane

Central 

(Central Aircraft Company Limited)
 Central CF.2a
 Central CF.4
 Central CF.5
 Central Centaur IIA
 Central Centaur IV
 Sayers S.C.W.

Central States 

(1926:Central States Aero Co Inc, Wallace Field, Bettendorf, IA, 1927:Renamed Central States Aircraft Co. 1928:Reorganized as Mono Aircraft Co, Moline, IL)
 Central States Monocoupe 22

Central Washington 

(Central Washington Air Service, Wenatchee, WA)
 Central Washington 1931 monoplane

Century 

(Century Aircraft Co, Kansas City, MO)
 Century SMB-4 (Beal Centurion)

Century 

(Century Aerospace Corporation, Albuquerque, NM)
 Century CA-100 Century Jet

Century 

(Century Aircraft Corp, 715 W 22 St, Chicago, IL)
 Century Amphibian Monoplane (aka Sea Devil)

Cercle Aéronautique de SGAC
(Cercle Aéronautique de SGAC)
 SGAC Marabout

CERVA 

(Consortium Europeén de Réalisation et de Ventes d'Avions)
 CERVA CE.43 Guépard
 CERVA CE.44 Couguar
 CERVA CE.45 Léopard

Cessna 
(1933: Cessna Aircraft Co.)
 Cessna A-37 Dragonfly
 Cessna AT-8
 Cessna AT-17
 Cessna C-16
 Cessna C-28A
 Cessna C-35
 Cessna C-77
 Cessna C-78 Bobcat
 Cessna C-94
 Cessna C-106
 Cessna C-126
 Cessna C-172
 Cessna H-41 Seneca
 Cessna JRC
 Cessna L-19
 Cessna L-27
 Cessna O-1 Bird Dog
 Cessna O-2 Skymaster
 Cessna OE
 Cessna T-37
 Cessna T-41 Mescalero
 Cessna U-3 Blue Canoe
 Cessna U-17
 Cessna U-20
 Cessna 1911 Monoplane "Silver Wings"
 Cessna 1914 Monoplane
 Cessna 1916 Monoplane
 Cessna 120
 Cessna 140
 Cessna 150 Aerobat
 Cessna 152 Trainer/Commuter/Aerobat
 Cessna 160
 Cessna 162 Skycatcher
 Cessna 165 Airmaster
 Cessna 170
 Cessna 172 Skyhawk/Hawk XP/Cutlass/Cutlass RG/Powermatic/Skyhawk Powermatic etc. etc.
 Cessna 175 Skylark/Skyhawk
 Cessna 177 Cardinal/Cardinal RG/Classic
 Cessna 180 Skywagon
 Cessna 182 Skylane/deLuxe/Super Skylane
 Cessna 185 Skywagon/AGwagon/CarryAll
 Cessna 187
 Cessna 188 AGwagon/AGpickup/AGtruck/AGhusky
 Cessna 190 Businessliner
 Cessna 195 Businessliner
 Cessna 205 Skywagon
 Cessna 206 Super Skylane/Stationair/Super Cargo Master/Turbo Stationair
 Cessna 207 Skywagon
 Cessna 208 Caravan I/Grand Caravan/Cargomaster/Soloy Pathfinder
 Cessna 210 Centurion
 Cessna 303 Clipper
 Cessna T303 Crusader
 Cessna 305 O-1 Bird Dog
 Cessna 308
 Cessna 309
 Cessna 310
 Cessna 318 T-37
 Cessna 319 USNRL BLC experiments
 Cessna 320 SkyKnight/Executive Skyknight
 Cessna 321 OE
 Cessna 325 L-19 modified crop-sprayer
 Cessna 327
 Cessna 335
 Cessna 336 Skymaster
 Cessna 337 Skymaster/Super Skymaster
 Cessna 339 Super Skymaster
 Cessna 340
 Cessna 350 formerly the Columbia 350
 Cessna 400 formerly the Columbia 400
 Cessna 401
 Cessna 402 Businessliner/Utililiner/Utilitwin
 Cessna 404 Titan/Ambassador/Courier/Freighter
 Cessna 405
 Cessna 406 ???
 Cessna 407
 Cessna 408 SkyCourier
 Cessna 411
 Cessna 414
 Cessna 421 Executive Commuter/Golden Eagle
 Cessna 425 Corsair/Conquest I
 Cessna 441 Conquest I/II
 Cessna 500 Citation
 Cessna 501 Citation
 Cessna 525 Citation Jet
 Cessna 526 JPATS Citation Jet
 Cessna 550 Citation II/Citation SII/Citation Bravo
 Cessna 551 Citation S/IISP
 Cessna 560 Citation V/Citation Ultra/Citation Excel
 Cessna 561 Citation Excel
 Cessna 620
 Cessna 650 Citation III/VI/VII
 Cessna 670 Citation IV
 Cessna Citation Latitude
 Cessna 680 Citation Sovereign
 Cessna 750 Citation X
 Cessna 1014 XMC initial config.
 Cessna 1034 XMC later config.
 Cessna A
 Cessna AA
 Cessna AC
 Cessna AF Special
 Cessna AS
 Cessna AW
 Cessna A Racer
 Cessna BW
 Cessna C-3
 Cessna C-34
 Cessna C-37
 Cessna C-38 Airmaster
 Cessna C-145 Airmaster
 Cessna C-165 Airmaster
 Cessna Caravan
 Cessna CG-2
 Cessna Citation Family page with links to various sub-models
 Cessna Clipper
 Cessna CM-1
 Cessna CO-119 Bird Dog Italian Army
 Cessna Comet
 Cessna Conquest
 Cessna Corsair
 Cessna CPG-1
 Cessna CPW-6
 Cessna CR-1
 Cessna CR-2
 Cessna CR-3
 Cessna Crane
 Cessna CW-6
 Cessna DC-6
 Cessna EC-1 Baby Cessna
 Cessna EC-2 Baby Cessna
 Cessna FC-1
 Cessna GC-1
 Cessna GC-2
 Cessna LSA Sport
 Cessna P-7
 Cessna P-10
 Cessna P-260
 Cessna P-780
 Cessna T-50 Bobcat Company designation
 Cessna TTx
 Cessna X210 tailwheel 210 prototype
 Cessna XMC
 Cessna-General Motors Special
 Cessna CIRPAS Pelican

CFM Air
(Ciriè, Italy)
CFM Air Dardo

CGS Aviation
(CGS Aviation, Inc., Grand Bay, AL)
CGS Hawk Classic
CGS Hawk Arrow
CGS Hawk Plus
CGS Hawk Sport
CGS Hawk Ultra
CGS AG-Hawk
CGS Hawk Classic II
CGS Hawk Arrow II

Chaboud 

(Claude Chaboud)
 Chaboud CJC.01

Chadwick 

 Chadwick C-122

Chagnès 

(Léo Chagnès)
 Chagnes Microstar
 Chagnès CB.10

Chaika 

(Chaika (Seagull Experimental Design Bureau), Samara)
 Chaika L-3
 Chaika L-4
 Chaika L-42
 Chaika L-42M
 Chaika L-44
 Chaika L-6 (Aero-Volga L-6)

Chalard 

(Jacques et Renée Chalard)
 Chalard JRC-01 Julcar

Challis 

(Hosea James Challis, Rensselaer, IN)
 Challis Parasol

Chamberlin 

(1929: (Clarence D) Chamberlin  Aeronautical Corp, Jersey City, NJ, 1930: Crescent Aircraft Corp Aircraft Corp (Pres: C D Chamberlin), 372 Lembeck Ave, Jersey City, NJ, 1930: Bankruptcy. 1939: Reorganization.)
 Chamberlin 2-S
 Chamberlin Cadet
 Chamberlin Pursuit Trainer
 Chamberlin A
 Chamberlin 2-S
 Chamberlin C-2 Trainer
 Chamberlin 2-S
 Chamberlin C-5 Super Sport
 Chamberlin C-5A Pursuit Trainer
 Chamberlin C-82
 Chamberlin Puddle Jumper
 Crescent Transport

Chambers 

(A A Chambers, Hornell, NY)
 Chambers High-wing

Chambers 

(Russell Chambers, Pomona, CA)
 Chambers R-1
 Chambers Trainer

Chambon Koenig 

 Chambon Koenig CK.01 Profil

Chamoy
(M. Fernand Chamoy)
 Chamoy monoplane trainer

Champion 

(Champion Airplane Co (Lester F Bishop), Chicago, IL)
 Champion 1915 Biplane

Champion 

(Champion Aircraft Corp.)
 Champion 402 Lancer
 Champion 7EC Traveler
 Champion 7ECA Citabria
 Champion 7FC Tri-Traveler
 Champion 7GC Sky-Trac
 Champion 7GCAA Citabria
 Champion 7GCB
 Champion 7GCBA Challenger
 Champion 7GCBC Citabria
 Champion 7HC DX'er
 Champion 7JC Tri-Con
 Champion 7KCA
 Champion 7KCAB Citabria
 Champion 8GCBC Scout
 Champion 8KCAB Citabria Pro
 Champion Olympia

Champion 

(Champion Aircraft Co (unrelated to the previous))
 Champion Citabria
 Champion Citabria 150S
 Champion Scout

Chance Vought 

(see List of aircraft (V)#Vought)

Chandelle

(Chandelle Aircraft)
Chandelle Mk IV

Changhe

(Changhe Aircraft Industries Corporation)
 Changhe CA109
 Changhe Z-8
 Changhe Z-11
 Changhe Z-18

Chanute 

(Octave Chanute, United States)
 Chanute Multiplane

Chanonhouse 

(Fred C Chanonhouse, Squantum, MA)
 Chanonhouse Stevens

Chaparral 

(Chaparral Motors, Polmar Lake, CO)
 Chaparral 2T-1A

Chapeau & Blanchet 

 Chapeau & Blanchet JC-1 Levrier
 Chapeau & Blanchet JC-
 Chapeau & Blanchet CB.10

Charette Executive Vertiplane 

 Charette Executive Vertiplane

Charles 

((Ralph) Charles Airplane & Motor Co, 140 S 5th St, Zanesville, OH)
 Charles A
 Charles E-1
 Charles Flivver
 Charles MA-1

Charles 

(P D Charles, Gettysburg, PA)
 Charles R-1

Charliss-Wendling 

 Charliss-Wendling 1910 aeroplane

Charpentier

(Jean Charpentier )
 Charpentier C-1

Chase 
(Chase Aircraft Company)
 Chase MS.1 (XCG-14)
 Chase MS.7 (Company designation for the XCG-14B)
 Chase MS.8 Avitruc
 Chase XCG-14 (First prototype, all-wooden.)
 Chase XCG-14A (Wood and metal version of XCG-14.) 24 seats.
 Chase YCG-14A (Production prototype version of XCG-14A, superseded by XCG-14B.)
 Chase YG-14A
 Chase XCG-14B
 Chase CG-18
 Chase G-18
 Chase CG-20
 Chase G-20
 Chase YC-122 Avitruc
 Chase XC-123
 Chase XC-123A

Chase-Gouverneur 

(H M Chase & M F H Gouverneur, Wilmington, NC)
 Chase-Gouverneur 1910 multiplane

Chasle 

(Yves Chasle)
 Chasle LMC-1 Sprintair
 Chasle YC-10 Migrateur
 Chasle YC-12 Tourbillon
 Chasle YC-15
 Chasle YC-20 Raz de Mareé 
 Chasle YC-100 Hirondelle
 Chasle YC-101
 Chasle YC-110
 Chasle YC-111
 Chasle YC-120
 Chasle YC-320

Châtelain

(Armand Châtelain)
 Châtelain AC.5 Bijou
 Châtelain AC.7
 Châtelain AC.9
 Châtelain AC.10
 Châtelain AC.11
 Châtelain AC.12
 Châtelain-Crépin
 Châtelain 2000

Chauvet

(C.H. Chauvet)
 Chauvet 1933 flying wing

Chauvière 

(Lucien Chauvière & Sylvio de Penteado)
 Chauvière-de Penteado 1909 Biplane
 Chauvière 1909 Monoplane
 Chauvière Gyroptere

Chayair 

(Chayair Manufacturing and Aviation, Musina, South Africa)
 Chayair Sycamore Mk 1
 Chayair Sycamore Mk 2000

Cheney (aircraft constructor) 

 Cheney 1

CAC 

(Chengdu Aircraft Corporation)
 Chengdu JJ-5
 Chengdu F-7
 Chengdu J-7
 Chengdu JZ-7
 Chengdu J-9
 Chengdu J-10
 Chengdu J-20
 Chengdu FC-1 Xiaolong
 Chengdu JF-17 Thunder
 Chengdu X-7 Jian Fan
 Chengdu CA-1

Chengdu 

(Chengdu Aircraft Corp.)
see CAC

Chernov 
(Boris Chernov & E.Yungerov / Gidroplan LLC / Gidrosamolet LCC)
 ChernoV Che-10
 Chernov Che-15
 Chernov Che-20
 Gidroplan Che-22 Korvet
 Chernov Che-23
 Gidrosamolet Che-24
 Chernov Che-25
 Gidrosamolet Che-26
 Chernov Che-27
 Gidrosamolet Che-28
 Gidrosamolet Che-29
 Chernov Che-30
 Chernov Che-35

Chester 

(Milton A Chester, Bristol, PA)
 Chester K-L-A-C

Chester 

(Art Chester, Chicago, IL, Air Racing Chester)
 Chester Jeep (aka Special #1)
 Chester Goon (aka Special #2)
 Chester Swee' Pea
 Chester Swee' Pea II
 Chester Wimpy

Chicago 

(Chicago Aeroplane Mfg Co, Chicago, IL)
 Chicago 1911 biplane

Chicago 

(Chicago Aero Works, 326 River St, Chicago, IL)
 Chicago Star Junior
 Chicago Star Junior Sport
 Chicago Star Tractor
 Chicago Star Military Tractor
 Chicago Speed Scout

Chicago 

(Chicago Aviation Co/Chicago Aviation School, Chicago, IL)
 Chicago Viking 10-A

Chicago-Midwest 

( Chicago-Midwest Aircraft Co, Dayton, OH)
 Chicago-Midwest X-101 (aka Dayton Overmount X)

Chichester-Miles 

( Chichester-Miles Consultants / CMC)
 CMC Leopard

Chickasha 

(Chickasha Aeroplane Co, Chickasha, OK)
 Chickasha 1911 aeroplane

Chilton 

 Chilton D.W.1
 Chilton D.W.2

Chilleen-Fitton 

(Simon Chilleen, Oak Park, IL, Fitton name or role unknown.)
 Chilleen-Fitton H-22 Special

Chincul 

(Chincul S.A.C.A.I.F.I.)
 Chincul Cherokee Arrow Trainer
 Chincul Cherokee Pawnee Trainer

Chinese Republic

(Republic of China / Nationalist China)
 Chu CJC-3
 Xianyi Rosamonde (aka Dashatou Rosamonde)
 Foochow Ning Hae 2
 Naval Air Establishment Beeng
 Naval Air Establishment Ding
 Naval Air Establishment Chiang Ho (River Crane) floatplane
 Naval Air Establishment Chiang Feng (River Phoenix)
 Naval Air Establishment Chiang Hung (River Swan)
 Naval Air Establishment Chiang Gae'n
 Haunlong 19
 Fu-Shing AP-1
 Schoettler I Dulux Dashatou(Ferdinand Leopold Schoettler and Ernst Fuetterer – China)
 Schoettler III (Ferdinand Leopold Schoettler and Ernst Fuetterer – China)?
 Schoettler B3 (Ferdinand Leopold Schoettler and Ernst Fuetterer – China)
 Schoettler S4 (Ferdinand Leopold Schoettler and Ernst Fuetterer – China)
 Schoettler C5 (Ferdinand Leopold Schoettler and Ernst Fuetterer – China)
 Guangzhou No.51
 Guangzhou No.53
 Guangzhou No.54
 Guangzhou No.57
 Guangzhou No.58
 Guangzhou No.59
 Guangzhou No.74
 Huang Xiaoci trainer (黃孝慈)
 Type 3 trainer
 Glider Type 1
 Hsin-1 Ning Hai 2
 Liuchow Kwangsi Type 3
 Guiyang XP-1
 Guiyang XP-2
 Chung Yun-1
 Chung Yun-2
 Chu CJC-3(Major General C.J. Chu)
 Chu CJC-3A(Major General C.J. Chu)
 Chu Hummingbird A(Major General C.J. Chu)
 Chu Hummingbird B(Major General C.J. Chu)
 Chu XP-0(Major General C.J. Chu)
 Yench'u X-P1
 Chu D-2(Major General C.J. Chu)

Chinhae Naval Shipyard 

 Chinhae Naval Shipyard flying-boat

Chipman 

(Phil Chipman, Anaheim CA.)
 Chipman Challenge

Chiquet-Van Zandt 

(L F Chiquet and H Van Zandt, White Plains, NY)
 Chiquet-Van Zandt Aerial turbine

Chmielewski 

(Joseph Chmielewski, Cleveland, OH)
 Chmielewski 1A

Chodan 

(Chodan first name unknown, Czechoslovakia and United States)
 Chodan Helicopter

Chotia 

(Designer: John Chotia)
 Chotia Gypsy
 Chotia Weedhopper
 Chotia Woodhopper

CHRDI

(China Helicopter Research and Development Institute)
 CHRDI/CAE Z-7
 CHRDI Z-10
 CHRDI/Changhe WZ-10 (no relation  to Z-10)

Chris Tena 

(Chris Tena, Hillsboro, OR, 1978: Sport Air Craft Corp.)
 Chris Tena Mini CoupeL F Chiquet and H Van Zandt, White Plains, NY

Chrislea 

 Chrislea L.C.1 Airguard
 Chrislea C.H.3 Series 1 Ace
 Chrislea C.H.3 Series 2 Super Ace
 Chrislea C.H.3 Series 3 Skyjeep
 Chrislea C.H.3 Series 4 Skyjeep

Christavia 

(Elmwood Aviation, Belleville, Ontario, Canada)
 Christavia Mk.I
 Christavia Mk.II
 Christavia Mk.IV

Christen 

(Christen Industries Inc (Fdr: Frank L Christensen), Hollister, CA, 1991: Acquired by Aviat Aircraft Inc, Afton, WY)
 Christen Eagle I
 Christen Eagle II
 Christen Husky

Christensen 

(Harvey Christensen)
 Christensen 1948 monoplane

Christmas 

(1910: (Dr William Whitney) Christmas Aeroplane Co, Washington, DC, c.1912: Durham Christmas Aeroplane Sales & Exhibition Co. 1918: Cantilever Aero Co, Copiague, NY)
 Christmas 1912 pusher biplane
 Christmas 1913 tractor biplane
 Christmas 1915 biplane
 Christmas Aerial Express
 Christmas Bullet
 Christmas Red Bird 1909 biplane
 Christmas Red Bird II 1910 biplane

Christofferson 

((Harry & Silas) Christofferson Aeroplanes, Portland and Vancouver, WA)
 Christofferson 1912 biplane trainer
 Christofferson 1912 biplane
 Christofferson 1914 Tractor biplane
 Christofferson 1915 Tractor biplane
 Christofferson 1920 Pauling Edwards Amphibian
 Christofferson Model D
 Christofferson Looping biplane
 Christofferson Flying Bike
 Christofferson Flying Boat
 Christofferson Hydro

Christopher

 Christopher AG-1

Chrysler 

(Chrysler Group, Detroit, MI)
 Chrysler VZ-6

Chu 

(Major General C.J. Chu)
 Chu CJC-3
 Chu CJC-3A
 Chu Hummingbird A
 Chu Hummingbird B
 Chu XP-0
 Chu D-2

Chudzik

(Claude Chudzik)
 Chudzik CC.01

ChUR

(G.G. Chechet-M.K. Ushkov-N.V. Rebikov)
 ChUR No.1

Church 

((James) Church Airplane & Mfg Co, Chicago, IL)
 Church Mid-Wing JC-1
 Church Low-wing

Church & Miller 

(P W Church & F R Miller (as part of (Lee U) Eyerly Aircraft Corp), Salem, OR)
 Church & Miller Monoplane

Chyeranovskii 

(Boris Ivanovich Cheranovsky, Soviet Union)
 Chyeranovskii BICh-1 Parabola
 Chyeranovskii BICh-2 Parabola (AVF-15)
 Chyeranovskii BICh-3
 Chyeranovskii BICh-5
 Chyeranovskii BICh-7
 Chyeranovskii BICh-7A
 Chyeranovskii BICh-8 Treugolnik
 Chyeranovskii BICh-9 Gnome
 Chyeranovskii BICh-10
 Chyeranovskii BICh-11 (Korolyev RP-1)
 Chyeranovskii BICh-12
 Chyeranovskii BICh-12 Parabola
 Chyeranovskii BICh-13
 Chyeranovskii BICh-13 Triangle
 Chyeranovskii BICh-14 (TsKB-10)
 Chyeranovskii BICh-16
 Chyeranovskii BICh-17 (see Kurchyevskii)
 Chyeranovskii BICh-18 Human-powered ornithopter also flown as a glider with wings locked
 Chyeranovskii BICh-20 Pionyer
 Chyeranovskii BICh-21
 Chyeranovskii BICh-22
 Chyeranovskii BICh-24
 Chyeranovskii BICh-25
 Chyeranovskii BICh-26
 Chyeranovskii SG-1

Chyetverikov 

 Chyetverikov ARK-3
 Chyetverikov Chye-2
 Chyetverikov Gidro-1
 Chyetverikov MDR-3
 Chyetverikov MDR-6
 Chyetverikov MP-2
 Chyetverikov OSGA-101
 Chyetverikov SPL
 Chyetverikov TA
 Chyetverikov TA-1
 Chyetverikov TAF

CIAC

(CIAC - Corporacion de la Industria Aeronautica Colombiana SA)
 CIAC T-90 Calima

Cicaré 

(Augusto Ulderico Cicaré / Cicaré Helicopteros S.A.)
 Cicaré CK.1 "Colibri"
 Cicaré CH-1
 Cicaré CH-2
 Cicaré CH-3
 Cicaré CH-4
 Cicaré CH-5 – AG
 Cicaré CH-6
 Cicaré CH-7
 Cicaré CH-7 2000 Angel
 Cicaré CH-8 2002 VL
 Cicaré CH-10C
 Cicaré CH-11C
 Cicaré CH-14 Aguilucho
 Cicaré SVH-3 (heli sim)
 Cicaré CH-2000
 Cicaré CH-2002

Cierva 

(Juan de Cierva, Cierva Autogiro Company)
 Cierva C.1 Autogiro N°1
 Cierva C.2 Autogiro N°2
 Cierva C.3 Autogiro N°3
 Cierva C.4 Autogiro N°4
 Cierva C.5
 Cierva C.6A
 Cierva C.6C (Avro Type 574)
 Cierva C.6D (Avro Type 575)
 Cierva C.8
 Cierva C.9
 Cierva C.10
 Cierva C.12
 Cierva C.14
 Cierva C.17
 Cierva C.19
 Cierva C.20
 Cierva C.21
 Cierva C.24
 Cierva C.25
 Cierva C.29
 Cierva C.30
 Cierva C.33
 Cierva C.38
 Cierva C.40
 Cierva CR Twin
 Cierva W.5
 Cierva W.6
 Cierva W.9
 Cierva W.10 Air Horse?
 Cierva W.11 Air Horse
 Cierva W.14 Skeeter
 Cierva-Lepère CL.10

Cieslak 

(Zane Cieslak, St Louis, MO and Normandy, MO)
 Cieslak C Little Pal

CIL

(Complexu Industrializare Lemnului – Reghin)
 CIL Reghin RG-7 Şoim – (Nowitchi)
 CIL Reghin RG-7 Şoim III – (Nowitchi)
 CIL Reghin RG-8 H1 Tintar – (Rado-Nowitchi)
 CIL Reghin RG-9 Albatros

Cincinnati 

(Jungclass Automobile Co, Cincinnati, OH)
 Cincinnati 1910 Monoplane

Cinquanta 

(Joe Cinquanta, Paradise, CA)
 Cinquanta Hornet
 Cinquanta D B Hawker II

Circa 

(Circa Reproductions Inc (Pres: Michael Lee), Calgary, Alberta, Canada)
 Circa Nieuport 11
 Circa Nieuport 12
 Circa Nieuport 17
 Circa Morane-Saulnier N
 Circa Sopwith Baby
 Circa Sopwith Tabloid
 Circa Sopwith Triplane

Cirigliano 

(Serafin Cirigliano, New Castle, DE & Farmingdale, NY)
 Cirigliano SC-1 Baby Hawk
 Smith-Cirigiliano SC-1

Cirrus 

(Cirrus Aircraft (founders: Alan and Dale Klapmeier, Pres: Patrick Waddick), Duluth, MN)
 Cirrus SRV
 Cirrus SR20 & SR20-G2/G3/G6
 Cirrus SR22 & SR22-G2/G3/G5/G6
 Cirrus SR22T & SR22T-G5/G6
 Cirrus SR Sport (SRS)
 Cirrus ST50 
 Cirrus Vision SF50/G2 Vision Jet
 Cirrus VK-30 (Viken-Klapmeier)

CITA
(Centro de Industria y Technologia Aeroespacial Bolivia)
 CITA Tiluchi
 CITA Gavilán

Citroën-Marchetti 

(Citroën & Charles Marchetti)
 Citroën-Marchetti Re.1
 Citroën-Marchetti Re.2

Civil Aviation Department of India 
(Ministry of Civil Aviation (India) – Civil Aviation Department)
 Civil Aviation Department ATS-1 Ardhra
 Civil Aviation Department HS-1
 Civil Aviation Department HS-2 Mrigasheer
 Civil Aviation Department ITG-3
 Civil Aviation Department KS-II Kartik
 Civil Aviation Department MG-1
 Civil Aviation Department Revathi
 Civil Aviation Department RG-1 Rohini
 Civil Aviation Department TS-2 Ashvini
 Civil Aviation Department TS-4 Ashvini II
 Civil Aviation Department LT-1 Swati

Civilian 
(Civilian Aircraft Company)
 Civilian Coupé

ČKD-Praga 
(see Praga)

Clairco
(David Saunders / Cheetah Light Aircraft Company Ltd. / Clairco)
 Clairco Cheetah
 Clairco Super Cheetah

Clark 
(James W Clark, Bridgewater, PA)
 Clark 1900 Ornithopter

Clark 

(Earl H & Donald Clark, Buffalo, NY)
 Clark M-1

Clark 

(Clark Airplane Co (founders: Richard D Clark, Charles D Reed), Ponca City, OK)
 Clark 1930 aeroplane

Clark 

((Virginius E) Clark Aurcraft Corp.)
 Clark 46 Duramold

Clark 

(Clark Aircraft Inc, Marshall, TX)
 Clark 12
 Clark 1000C

Clark & Wood 

(Jesse O Clark & Delmar E Wood, 807 W Noble Ave, Visalia, CA)
 Clark & Wood RKM-1

Clark-Fitzwilliams 

 Clark-Fitzwilliams Cycloplane

Clarke 

(J Clarke, Chicago, IL)
 Clarke 1909 biplane

Classic 

(Classic Aircraft Co, Lansing MI, aka Classic Aero Enterprises.)
 Classic F5 (replica Waco F-5)
 Classic YMF Super (replica Waco YMF)
 Classic HJ-2 Honey Bee
 Classic H-3 pegasus
 Classic HP-40 Warhawk

Classic Fighter Industries

Classic Fighter Industries Me 262 Project

Clavé

(Robert Clavé)
 Clavé le Goëland

Claxton High School

 Claxton High School Lil' Rascal

Cleary 

((W) Cleary Aircraft Corp)
 Cleary CL-1 Zipper

Clem 

(John Wesley Clem, Kansas City, KS)
 Clem Gold Bug

Clement

(Louis Clement)
 Clement Triplane
 Clement racing monoplane
 Clement-Moineau Monoplane Racer

Clément-Bayard
(Gustave Adolphe Clément-Bayard)
 Clément-Bayard No.1
 Clément-Bayard No.2
 Clément-Bayard No.3
 Clément-Bayard No.4
 Clément-Bayard No.5
 Clément-Bayard No.6
 Clément-Bayard 1909 (Demoiselle project - cf Santos-Dumont)
 Clément-Bayard 1910 triplane
 Clément-Bayard 1911 monoplane
 Clément-Bayard 1911 biplane
 Clément-Bayard 1912 biplane
 Clément-Bayard 1912 monoplane
 Clément-Bayard 1913 monoplane
 Clément-Bayard 1913 flying boat
 Clément-Bayard Military monoplane
 Clément-Bayard Military biplane
 Clément-Bayard bomber 1915/16

Clemson 

(Aero Club, Clemson College, SC)
 Clemson Special

Cleone 

(Cleone Motors Co, St Louis, MO)
 Cleone 5-M Paraquet
 Cleone 7-M

Clifton Brothers 

 Clifton Trio

Clinger 

(W R Clinger, Grandville, MI)
 Clinger CL-1

Cloquet 

(Cloquet Mfg Co dba Trainer Aircraft Co Inc (founders: Norman Nelson, Claude Phillips, "Rosie" Rosenthal), Cloquet, MN)
 Cloquet 1931 Monoplane

Cloudbaser Trikes

Cloudbaser Trikes Cloudbaser

Cloud-Coupe 

(Cloud Aircraft Co. Cloud-Coupe Aircraft & Motors Corp Inc, Milan, IN)
 Cloud-Coupe A-1
 Cloud-Coupe Cub
 Cloud-Coupe EXP-1
 Cloud-Coupe LW
 Cloud-Coupe M-P
 Cloud-Coupe SQ-2

Cloudbuster Ultralights

 Cloudbuster Ultralights Cloudbuster

Cloudcraft Glider Company

 Cloudcraft Dickson Primary
 Cloudcraft Junior
 Cloudcraft Phantom

Cloud Dancer 

(Cloud Dancer Aeroplane Works, Columbus, OH)
 Cloud Dancer Jenny Sport

Clouser 

(Robert W Clouser, Ontario, CA)
 Clouser CG-1 Gnat

Club ULM Rotor

(Kumertau, Bashkortostan, Russia)
Club ULM Rotor Ptenets-2

Clutton 

 Clutton-Tabenor FRED
 Clutton-Tabenor E.C.2 Easy Too

CMASA 

(Construzioni Mecchaniche Aeronautiche SA)
 CMASA MF.4
 CMASA MF.5
 CMASA MF.6
 CMASA MF.10
 CMASA G.8
 CMASA CS.15

C.N.A.

(Compagnia Nazionale Aeronautica)
 C.N.A. Beta
 C.N.A. Delta
 C.N.A. Eta
 C.N.A. Teta
 C.N.A. Merah
 C.N.A. 15
 C.N.A. 25
 C.N.A. PM.1

CNIAR 

(Centrul National al Industriei Aeronautice Románe)
 CNIAR IAR-93 Vultur

CNNA 

(Companhia Nacional de Navegação Aérea / HL = Henrique Lage)
 CNNA HL-1
 CNNA HL-2
 CNNA HL-3
 CNNA HL-4
 CNNA HL-5
 CNNA HL-6
 CNNA HL-8
 CNNA HL-14

CNNC

(Cia Nacional de Navegação Costeira)
 Lafay Independência

References

Further reading

External links

 List of aircraft (C)